Juliana Chaves Santos (born ) is a Brazilian female artistic gymnast, representing her nation at international competitions.  She participated at world championships, including the 2006 World Artistic Gymnastics Championships in  Aarhus, Denmark.

References

1990 births
Living people
Brazilian female artistic gymnasts
Place of birth missing (living people)
South American Games gold medalists for Brazil
South American Games medalists in gymnastics
Competitors at the 2014 South American Games
21st-century Brazilian women
20th-century Brazilian women